TuneWiki was a music-centered startup that provides scrolling lyrics through its social music players for cellphones and handheld devices. With over 6 million lyrics and the world's largest scrolling lyrics library, TuneWiki had agreements with the major music publishers including Sony, Universal, and EMI to legally use synchronized lyrics in TuneWiki's music applications. Furthermore, the mobile TuneWiki applications also used to provide lyrics for streaming radio on mobile phones, and TuneWiki has location-based technology to let users see where their favorite music is being played around the world. Users follow other users to discover music and discuss the music they listen to.

History
TuneWiki was founded in 2008 by Rani Cohen- Chairmen, Amnon Sarig- President, Chad Kouse- CTO, and Jared Fleener.
The company was purchased by Vert Capital in July 2013.

In 2010, TuneWiki entered into an agreement with Music Reports, Inc. which Music Report would make use of its Songdex database to identify songs, and would handle the licensing of the lyrics displayed through the TuneWiki application.
On June 20, 2013 a news article appeared stating that TuneWiki will shut down on June 28, 2013
On June 25, 2013 TuneWiki also sent an e-mail to registered users confirming the shutdown.
On June 28, 2013 TuneWiki was purchased by Vert Capital and notified its users that it would be remaining open.  During this transition period Seth Gerson was appointed CEO as part of the company's restructuring.
On August 13, 2014, TuneWiki shutdown without notice. Vert Capital has since failed to pay its datacenter bills, effectively shuttering the business.
On August 22, 2014 TuneWiki came back online with no official statement.
On November, 2014 TuneWiki officially shutdown.

Features
TuneWiki provides real-time scrolling lyrics that display as a song plays, for songs saved on the phone as well as for songs played through streaming radio, provided that the user first synchronizes the initial line of textual lyrics with the correct verse of the playing song.

A geolocation feature locates songs playing in the area of the user, and includes social media functionality for posting to popular social media websites.

Supported devices
TuneWiki had applications released for iPhone and iPod Touch, Android, Windows Phone 7, BlackBerry, Symbian S60v5, Nokia Series 40 (Java based) and Maemo, with a plugin for Windows Media Player, as well as an app for Spotify.

Controversy
TuneWiki was selected by various wireless carriers (such as Verizon Wireless) to preload their application onto cellphones before sale, typically accompanied by OS settings which prevent the owner of the device from deleting the application.

See also 
Libre.fm
Lyric Legend:Game designed by TuneWiki

References

External links
TuneWiki company website

Online music and lyrics databases
Android (operating system) software
BlackBerry software
American music websites